Francis Roberts Rush (1916–2001) was a Roman Catholic priest in Queensland, Australia. He was Roman Catholic Archbishop of Brisbane.

Early life
Francis Roberts Rush was born in Townsville on 11 September 1916, the son of Thomas Rush and his wife Mary (née Roberts).

Religious life
Francis Rush was ordained a priest in Rome on 18 March 1939. From 1939 to 1945, he served as a priest at the Sacred Heart Cathedral, Townsville.

He was appointed Bishop of Rockhampton on 7 November 1960, where he implemented many of the reforms of the Second Vatican Council.

He was appointed Roman Catholic Archbishop of Brisbane on 5 March 1973, replacing the retiring Patrick Mary O'Donnell.

Later life
Francis Rush retired on 3 December 1991 and lived in Brisbane in retirement. He died on 21 July 2001. His funeral was held in the Cathedral of St Stephen, Brisbane on 27 July 2001 conducted by Archbishop John Bathersby; Nearly one thousand people packed into the 800-seat cathedral with many standing in the aisles to farewell him.

References

Roman Catholic archbishops of Brisbane
Roman Catholic bishops of Rockhampton
1916 births
2001 deaths
20th-century Roman Catholic bishops in Australia
Australian Roman Catholic archbishops